Ysgol Uwchradd Bodedern is a co-educational secondary school in Bodedern, Anglesey, Wales first opened in 1977. It is a bilingual establishment run by Anglesey County Council.

History
Ysgol Uwchradd Bodedern opened on 6 September 1977 and the headteacher was Carol Hughes. It replaced the old National School in London Road which was then demolished in 1984. The school's symbol, designed by artist Tegwyn Francis Jones, is a thumb pressing seeds into the earth (hence the motto 'hau i fedi' or 'sowing to harvest').

The school in 2017

Pupils have the choice of studying a subject through the medium of English or Welsh. At GCSE, nearly all pupils must study at least two subjects in English and two in Welsh, in addition to English and Welsh as individual subjects.

There are around 1000 pupils at the school. The school facilities are available for public use during the evenings.

Notable former pupils

 George North, rugby player
Gareth Williams, GCHQ employee

References

Secondary schools in Anglesey
Educational institutions established in 1977
Welsh-language schools
School buildings completed in 1977
Bodedern
1977 establishments in Wales